Nocardioides kribbensis is a bacterium from the genus Nocardioides which has been isolated from alkaline soil in Korea.

References

External links
Type strain of Nocardioides kribbensis at BacDive -  the Bacterial Diversity Metadatabase	

kribbensis
Bacteria described in 2005